Paranapiacaba is a genus of skeletonizing leaf beetles and flea beetles in the family Chrysomelidae. There are at least two described species in Paranapiacaba.

Species
These two species belong to the genus Paranapiacaba:
 Paranapiacaba connexa (J. L. LeConte, 1865)
 Paranapiacaba tricincta (Say, 1824) (checkered melon beetle)

References

Further reading

External links

 

Galerucinae
Chrysomelidae genera